

List of notable individual fossil or subfossil mammoth remains

List of significant fossil or subfossil mammoth bone accumulations

See also

 La Brea tar pits
 Niederweningen Mammoth Museum
 Pleistocene Park

References

Mammoths
mammoths